I Supermodel 2 is the second season of the Chinese reality show and modeling competition of the same name. Filming for season two took place in London. The show featured 14 new contestants in the final cast. Special appearances for the show included several high-profile guests, including Alexa Chung, David Gandy, Erin O'Connor with Giovanni Squatriti, J. Alexander, Lily Donaldson, Miranda Kerr and former British supermodel Twiggy. The show premiered on October 22, 2015.

The prizes for this cycle included a modelling contract with Storm Model Management and an editorial spread in Harper's Bazaar China.

The winner of the competition was 23-year-old Zhao Jia Tong.

Contestants
(ages stated are at time of contest)

Episodes

Episode 1
Original Airdate: 

 Team KO: Liu Xin Jie (leader), Chen Yu Ting, Long Jun Jiao, Ma Hui Hui, Sun Chen Min, Wang Shu Qi & Zhao Jia Tong
 Team OK: Wang Meng Ya (leader), Bi Jing, Jiang Yun Xuan, Ma Meng Jia, Li Meng Qi, Na Guang Zi & Wang Xi Ran		

 Special guests: J. Alexander

Episode 2
Original Airdate: 

 Best photo: Chen Yu Ting
 Bottom two: Jiang Yun Xuan & Liu Xin Jie
 Eliminated: Jiang Yun Xuan
 Special guests: J. Alexander, fashion photographer Giovanni Squatriti & Erin O'Connor

Episode 3
Original Airdate: 

 Best photo: Bi Jing
 Bottom two: Ma Hui Hui & Wang Shu Qi
 Eliminated: Ma Hui Hui

Episode 4
Original Airdate: 

 Best photo: Zhao Jia Tong
 Bottom four: Chen Yu Ting, Li Meng Qi, Long Jun Jiao & Wang Xi Ran
 Eliminated: Li Meng Qi & Long Jun Jiao

Episode 5
Original Airdate: 

 Best photo: Liu Xin Jie
 Bottom two: Chen Yu Ting & Wang Xi Ran
 Eliminated: Chen Yu Ting

Episode 6
Original Airdate: 

 Best photo: Zhao Jia Tong
 Bottom two: Wang Shu Qi & Wang Xi Ran
 Eliminated: Wang Xi Ran

Episode 7
Original Airdate: 

 Best photo: Liu Xin Jie
 Bottom two: Bi Jing & Wang Shu Qi 
 Eliminated: Wang Shu Qi

Episode 8
Original Airdate: 

 Best photo: Bi Jing
 Bottom two: Sun Chen Min & Na Guang Zi
 Eliminated: Na Guang Zi

Episode 9
Original Airdate: 

 Best photo: Wang Meng Ya 
 Bottom two: Ma Meng Jia & Sun Chen Min 
 Eliminated: Sun Chen Min

Episode 10
Original Airdate: 

 Best photo: Ma Meng Jia
 Bottom two: Bi Jing & Liu Xin Jie 
 Originally eliminated: Liu Xin Jie

Episode 11
Original Airdate: 

 Best photo: Wang Meng Ya
 Bottom three: Bi Jing, Liu Xin Jie & Ma Meng Jia
 Eliminated: Bi Jing & Liu Xin Jie

Episode 12
Original Aridate: 

 Eliminated: Ma Meng Jia
 Final two: Wang Meng Ya & Zhao Jia Tong
 Winner: Zhao Jia Tong

Summaries

Call-out order

  The contestant received best photo
  The contestant was in the danger of elimination
  The contestant was eliminated
  The contestant was originally eliminated, but was saved
  The contestant won the competition

 In episode 1, there was no elimination and the models were divided into their teams. There were no mentors this season. Instead Meng Ya and Xin Jie, who were deemed to be the best performers in the cover shoot, were each designated the role of team leader. The leader of each team chose the first contestant of her team, the first chose the second, the second the third, etc., alternating between teams until all seven slots were filled.
 In episode 10, Xin Jie was originally eliminated but the judges decided to save her.

Photo shoot guide

 Episode 1 photo shoot: Makeovers; I Supermodel magazine covers
 Episode 2 photo shoot: Graveyard in pairs
 Episode 3 photo shoot: Bond girls
 Episode 4 photo shoot: Arcade games
 Episode 5 photo shoot: Subway grunge in pairs
 Episode 6 photo shoot: Posing with a horse
 Episode 7 photo shoot: Jumping from a trampoline
 Episode 8 photo shoot: Downton Abbey 
 Episode 9 photo shoot: Timeless fashion
 Episode 10 photo shoot: Wonderland editorial
 Episode 11 photo shoot: Wearing recycled garments
 Episode 12 photo shoot: Harper's Bazaar cover tries

References

External links
 Season 2 website
 Weibo site
 Hui Hui Ma on Models.com

I Supermodel
2015 Chinese television seasons